Minou Toussaint (7 October 1983) is a former Dutch woman cricketer. She has played for Netherlands in 9 Women's ODIs. Minou was a member of the Dutch cricket team in the 2001 Women's European Cricket Championship.

References

External links 
 

1983 births
Living people
Dutch women cricketers
Netherlands women One Day International cricketers
Sportspeople from Deventer